Susan Tucker may refer to:

Susan Tucker (politician), state senator for the US state of Massachusetts
Susan Tucker (historian), American historian who formerly worked at the Newcomb Archives

See also
Susan
Tucker (surname)